Matthew Robert Mills (born November 14, 1996) is an American professional stock car racing driver who competes part-time in the NASCAR Craftsman Truck Series, driving the No. 20 Chevrolet Silverado for Young's Motorsports. He has also previously competed in the NASCAR Xfinity Series and the NASCAR Cup Series.

Racing career

Early years
Mills started racing at age twelve in go-karts. A year later, he moved up to Junior Champ Karts and spent three years racing those. Mills started racing Open Wheel Modifieds at Midvale Speedway in 2012, winning rookie of the year and moving up to Outlaw Super Late Models in 2013. He attended a rookie seminar for NASCAR at Daytona Beach, Florida the following year and received clearance to race in the ARCA Racing Series and K&N Pro Series, but has yet to race in either of those series, instead running a limited schedule in the JEGS/CRA Pro Series in 2015 as well as continuing his late model career.

Truck Series
On June 29, 2016, it was announced that Mills would join SS-Green Light Racing for "select races" in the 2016 NASCAR Camping World Truck Series. He made his first start at Bristol Motor Speedway in August, finishing 27th. Mills ran four more races for SS-Green Light in 2016, scoring a best finish of 21st in the season's penultimate race at Phoenix International Raceway.

In 2017, he joined Faith Motorsports for three races because the team primary driver Donnie Levister was unapproved by NASCAR to run intermediate tracks. He ran seventeenth in two of them, career-best finishes, before he joined Martins Motorsports to run in multiple races in the truck No. 42 with sponsorship from Thompson Electric Inc. starting in Iowa. The truck never hit the track at Iowa and was never entered thereafter, however, the truck was included in the original edition of the 2017 video game NASCAR Heat 2. He drove the No. 44 for Martins the following week but fell out due to an accident. He then start and parked with Jennifer Jo Cobb Racing for a few races in the latter part of 2017.

Mills drove the No. 20 truck for Young's Motorsports part-time in 2022 in addition to running the majority of the Xfinity Series season for B. J. McLeod Motorsports in their No. 5 car. He returned to the team in 2023 to drive their No. 20 truck again at Las Vegas in March.

Xfinity Series
In March 2017, Mills was named the driver for B. J. McLeod Motorsports' No. 8 entry at Phoenix in what looked to be a one race deal, replacing regular driver Jeff Green who had been signed to run the full season. Mills finished 30th in his debut. He returned to the series over a month later at Richmond, again driving McLeod's No. 8. His next start in the series came at Chicago in September with JD Motorsports, start and parking their fourth car, the No. 15. In the season's final weekend, he failed to qualify with startup team NextGen Motorsports.

On February 2, 2018, it was announced that Mills will drive the No. 15 car for all but one race in 2018, skipping the season-opening race at Daytona International Speedway. He had previously been in consideration for the team's No. 0 car, which ultimately was driven by Garrett Smithley. He did not qualify for the Texas race in April because of inspection issues. The agreement wound up falling through, as Mills was replaced by Joe Nemechek for the Fitzgerald Glider Kits 300 at Bristol Motor Speedway. Mills returned for a couple more races but parted ways with JDM after the June Michigan race. He made a start for DGR-Crosley in the NASCAR Camping World Truck Series at Michigan in August, but wrecked, self-admittedly due to inexperience.

Mills returned to B. J. McLeod Motorsports for some fall Xfinity races, eventually becoming the team's full-time driver of the No. 8 in 2019. However, the number changed to 5 after the team agreed to give up their No. 8 for JR Motorsports in a number swap, and McLeod's team received the No. 5, the car number JRM dropped so they could get the No. 8.

Cup Series
On April 26, 2021, B. J. McLeod Motorsports announced that they would be fielding a Cup Series car in the spring race at Kansas, the No. 55, and that Mills would be the driver. It was his debut in the series. Although BJMM uses Chevrolets or Toyotas in the Xfinity Series, the car in this race was a Ford from McLeod's Live Fast Motorsports team, which he fields in the Cup Series but is a separate entity from BJMM.

Motorsports career results

NASCAR
(key) (Bold – Pole position awarded by qualifying time. Italics – Pole position earned by points standings or practice time. * – Most laps led.)

Cup Series

Xfinity Series

Craftsman Truck Series

 Season still in progress
 Ineligible for series points

References

External links
 
 

NASCAR drivers
Racing drivers from Virginia
1996 births
Living people
Sportspeople from Lynchburg, Virginia